Karen Parfitt Hughes (born December 27, 1956) is the global vice chair of the public relations firm Burson-Marsteller. She served as the Under Secretary of State for Public Diplomacy and Public Affairs in the U.S. Department of State and as a counsellor to President George W. Bush.

Early life
Born in Paris, France, Hughes is the daughter of American parents Patricia Rose (Scully) and Harold Parfitt, the last U.S. Governor of the Panama Canal Zone. After graduating from W. T. White High School in Dallas, Texas, Hughes earned a bachelor's degree at Southern Methodist University in 1977 where she was a member of Alpha Delta Pi sorority. She is of partial Irish and English descent.

Early career
Hughes worked as a television news reporter from 1977 to 1984. As a reporter, Hughes followed the 1980 presidential campaign. In 1984, she went to work as the Texas press coordinator for the Reagan-Bush campaign in the 1984 United States presidential election.  She later became executive director of the Republican Party of Texas.

White House

Since 1994, Hughes has worked with George W. Bush, first as director of his campaign for the office of governor of Texas, and then as a counselor from 2001 to 2002, while he was President of the United States.

Hughes left the Bush administration in July 2002 to return to Texas, but remained in daily contact with the Bush reelection campaign by telephone and e-mail, and spoke personally with Bush several times a week. In August 2004, Hughes returned to full-time service with the Bush campaign, setting up office on Air Force One, from where she planned the 2004 Republican National Convention and the late stages of the 2004 election. She has been praised by The Dallas Morning News as "the most powerful woman ever to serve in the White House", and by ABC News as Bush's "most essential advisor."

Ten Minutes from Normal
In March 2004, Hughes published Ten Minutes from Normal, which includes an account of her decision to leave the White House.  While promoting her book, she appeared on CNN on April 25, 2004 - the same day as the March for Women's Lives - and said "I think after September 11th the American people are valuing life more and realizing that we need policies to value the dignity and worth of every life. And President Bush has worked to say, let's be reasonable, let's work to value life, let's try to reduce the number of abortions, let's increase adoptions.  And I think those are the kind of policies that the American people can support, particularly at a time when we're facing an enemy, and really the fundamental difference between us and the terror network we fight is that we value every life. It's the founding conviction of our country, that we're endowed by our creator with certain unalienable rights, the right to life and liberty and the pursuit of happiness."

State Department

On March 14, 2005, Bush announced his intention to nominate Hughes for the undersecretary of state for public diplomacy with the rank of ambassador — a job focused on changing foreigners' perceptions about America.  The Senate confirmed her nomination in July 2005.
In her new capacity, Hughes spoke of improving the world's perception of the United States via creation of a "rapid-response unit" and a plan to "forward-deploy regional SWAT teams". During a town hall meeting on September 8, 2005, a State Department employee complained that "recently, we've had tremendous amount of difficulty in some cases getting clearance for our ambassadors to speak." Hughes replied, "If they make statements based on something I sent them, they're not going to be called on the carpet."

At the end of her tenure in the State Department, Hughes said that one of her greatest accomplishments had been "transforming public diplomacy and making it a national security priority central to everything we do in government". Hughes was the keynote speaker at the October 22, 2007, Public Relations Society of America's International Conference and discussed, "Waging Peace -- The New Paradigm for Public Diplomacy."

2005 tour of the Middle East
Starting with a September 26, 2005, stop in Egypt, Hughes went on a "listening tour" of the Middle East to speak with leaders and people from the region. This was a response to growing fears in America about rampant anti-Americanism in the Middle East. Hughes was the third person chosen for this task by President Bush, following unsuccessful attempts by Charlotte Beers and Margaret Tutwiler. For her tour, Hughes asked two Citizen Ambassadors to accompany her: a Georgetown PhD student, Tina Kareema Dauod, and William O'Brien, a retired high school geography teacher.

On her September 27 stop in Jeddah, Saudi Arabia, during a Q&A with students in which a student shared her appreciation of women being allowed to drive in the United States, Karen Hughes acknowledged that every country has to chart its own course and choose what's right for its own citizens, but also shared in the women's sentiment about the United States. Another woman shared: "The general image of the Arab woman is that she isn't happy [...] Well, we're all pretty happy."

In a press conference in Jakarta, Indonesia, Hughes incorrectly stated that Saddam Hussein "had murdered hundreds of thousands of his own people using poison gas." Conventional sources attest that Saddam did order the deaths of several hundred thousand Iraqis during the al-Anfal Campaign and other violent suppressions, but casualties from his infamous gas attack on Halabja numbered in the thousands.

Breast cancer research advocacy
Hughes met business representatives from the United Arab Emirates (UAE) to create the U.S.-U.A.E. Partnership for Breast Cancer Awareness and Research. It aims to develop breast cancer awareness campaigns and expand research in the Middle East by linking U.S. medical experts, fundraisers, health research activists, and businesses with their U.A.E. counterparts.

Post White House
In late October 2007, Hughes made it known that she would be resigning from her position in the Bush White House. Secretary of State Condoleezza Rice was quoted as saying she accepted the resignation "with a great deal of sadness but also a great deal of happiness for what she has achieved."

Hughes is currently the global vice chair of Burson-Marsteller, a public relations company.

References

Footnotes
 Rootsweb.com. Record on Karen (Parfitt) Hughes.
 Kerry Lauerman.  You burn out fast when you  demagogue, Salon.com, September 13, 2003.
 Interview of Karen Hughes.  Transcript of Late Edition with Wolf Blitzer, CNN.com, Aired April 5, 2004.
 Dana Milbank.  Hughes is Varnishing the Nation's Tarnish, The Washington Post, September 9, 2005.
 Transcript of Interview of Bob Garfield. Scuttle Diplomacy, On the Media, June 1, 2007.
 U.S. Department of State Transcript. Briefing En Route Ankara, Turkey. September 26, 2005
 Steven R. Weisman.  Saudi Women Have Message for U.S. Envoy, New York Times, September 28, 2005.
 Alan Sipress. Hughes Misreports Iraqi History, Washington Post, October 22, 2005.
 Elizabeth Kelleher.  State's Hughes Joins Dubai Businesswomen To Fight Breast Cancer, U.S. Department of State, November 1, 2006.
 USME Partnership for Breast Cancer Awareness and Research.  US Middle East Partnership Website.

External links

 Special Report on Karen Hughes' nomination to Under Secretary for Public Diplomacy
 USC Center on Public Diplomacy Wiki profile on Hughes and her new position
 Testimony at confirmation hearing before the Senate Foreign Relations Committee, Washington, DC (July 22, 2005)
 Marketing America (March 16, 2005) PBS Online NewsHour featuring Karen Hughes.
 Profile: Karen Hughes, SourceWatch
  Karen Hughes and the collapse of American public diplomacy
 Karen Hughes Addresses PRSA
 Karen Hughes on 'Meet the Press' (July 12, 2009)

|-

|-

1956 births
American political consultants
American Presbyterians
Counselors to the President
George W. Bush administration personnel
Harvard Institute of Politics
Living people
People from Austin, Texas
Southern Methodist University alumni
Texas Republicans
United States Under Secretaries of State
White House Communications Directors
Zonians
W. T. White High School alumni
American women ambassadors
Ambassadors of the United States
21st-century American women